Kneipenterroristen (German for Pub Terrorists) is the fifth album by German rock band Böhse Onkelz. It was released in 1988.

Track listing
Kneipenterroristen (Pub Terrorists)
Religion
Lack + Leder (Lacquer and Leather)
So sind wir (That's How We Are )
Tanz der Teufel (Dance of the Devils)
28 
Guten Tag (Good Day; or here: Have a Nice Day)
Nie wieder (Never Again)
Freddy Krüger
Ein guter Freund (A Good Friend)

Track notes

Kneipenterroristen
A song about vandalism and "terrorism" in taverns and pubs.

Religion
The band condemn religion in this song, because wars were led and humans were burned in its name.

So sind wir
A song, which glorifies the band. "That's how we are, and that is our life / what could be better than to be an Onkel (uncle)"

28
Singer Kevin lived this time in Frankfurt in an appartement in the Weberstraße 28. There were celebrated wild parties and consumed drugs. Gonzo and Stephan wanted to catch the heights and depths in this appartement into an instrumental song, which became the house number as title.

Nie wieder
Some friends of the band went to jail. The Onkelz didn't want to go this way and wrote a song about it.

Freddy Krüger

A song about the singers "good friend" Freddy Krüger.

Ein guter Freund
Cover version of the same-named song by Heinz Rühmann, Willy Fritsch and Oskar Karlweis from 1930. This song is only included on CD as a bonus track.

Charts

References

Böhse Onkelz albums
1988 albums
German-language albums